Spiranthes australis, commonly known as austral ladies tresses, is a species of orchid that grows from southern Caspian Sea and Himalayan Mountains to the South-West Pacific and north throughout Japan. It has up to about ten leaves at the base of a flowering stem with up to sixty small pink and white flowers spirally arranged around it.

Description
The lateral sepals and petals are a similar size to the dorsal sepal but narrower. The labellum has a grainy texture and its edges are crinkled. Flowering occurs from October to March or later but the flowers are self-pollinating.

Taxonomy and naming
Spiranthes australis was first formally described in 1810 by Robert Brown and the description was published in Prodromus Florae Novae Hollandiae et Insulae Van Diemen. The specific epithet (australis) is a Latin word meaning "southern". The taxonomic concept of this species was expanded in 2019, and its relationship with Spiranthes sinensis clarified.

Distribution and habitat

Austral ladies' tresses usually grows in boggy or swampy places but also in high-rainfall grassy places. 

It is widely distributed from the southern Caspian Sea of Iran and Georgia (reported as S. amoena, synonym of S. australis)

S. australis is the most well-known orchid in Japan. It is first attested in the Manyoshu collection of poetry, which was compiled ca. 760 CE. It is found in common places such as balconies, private gardens, and lawns. It is also seen in parks in natural spaces. 

In Australia, it occurs from Queensland, south through eastern New South Wales, the Australian Capital Territory and Victoria to Tasmania. It is sometimes also found in South Australia.

Conservation
Spiranthes australis is common throughout most of its range but is classed as "Rare" in South Australia where it is only known from the Mount Compass area.

Use in horticulture
This orchid is relatively easy to grow in a well-drained, sandy potting mix. It sometimes occurs as a weed in commercial nurseries.

References

External links 
 

australis
Flora of New South Wales
Flora of South Australia
Flora of Tasmania
Flora of Victoria (Australia)
Plants described in 1810
Endemic orchids of Australia